Sur-Choc is a music group from Côte d'Ivoire.

The Frères Gazeurs were originally four kids from the ghettos of Abidjan. They used a cappella singing, djembe and a bell to play "ambiance facile" (easy groove), a traditional-modern style. Since 1987, they have been playing under the name of Sur-Choc (over-shock): percussionist Henri-Jacques Kipré, two singers (Privat and Feu Sergent) and Dékiss, the group's leader and creator of the Gnakpa Gnakpa dance style. Between 1990 and 2002, the four chalked up six albums of Zouglou music, the pop style that grew from 'ambiance facile'.

In 2003, Sur-Choc released the album "Magnum". Their seventh album was accompanied by a new dance step called "coupé-décalé". The track "Fou Ho" was featured on the soundtrack of the FIFA Street 2005 game.

References
 
Sur-Choc on Music Wire

Ivorian musical groups